This is a list of the Presiding Bishops of the Episcopal Church in the United States. Initially the position of Presiding Bishop rotated geographically. After 1795 the Presiding Bishop was the senior bishop in order of consecration. Starting in 1926, the office became elective, the Presiding Bishop being chosen at General Convention by vote by all bishops, and approved by the House of Deputies. The office now has a nine-year term. Since 1938 the Presiding Bishop has been required to resign his or her former diocese after accepting election.

Presiding Bishop rotated by geographical area

Presiding Bishop by seniority

Presiding Bishop by election

References

External links

Episcopal Church Table of Past Presiding Bishops

United States
Episcopal
 
Presiding Bishops